Rostamabad (also romanized as Rostamābād) is a village in Nurabad Rural District, in the Central District of Delfan County, Lorestan Province, Iran. At the time of the 2006 Census, its population was 26, contained within 5 families.

References 

Towns and villages in Delfan County